Yobi, the Five Tailed Fox is a 2007 animated South Korean film by Lee Sung-gang, the director of My Beautiful Girl, Mari. The film loosely draws upon the Korean folk tales of the kumiho.

Story 
One hundred years ago, aliens landed on a mountain near where a small, white five tailed fox lived. After being stranded on Earth for one hundred years, they are ready for a test flight to see if they can return home. The test fails as one of the aliens makes a mistake, and the other aliens tell him to leave.

The runaway alien finds itself taken in by a class of students at the foot of the mountain. There, a teacher named Kang trains students who do not fit in at a regular school. In order to save the alien, the five tailed fox takes on the form of a human girl, and joins the school under the name of Yobi.

Staying at the school, Yobi becomes friends with one of the students, a boy named Geum-ee. She grows more and more attached to humans and enjoys her time with them, until a fox hunter appears, as well as a shadow detective named Mr. Shadow who gives Yobi a device which will allow her to become human by taking the soul from a human.

Yobi becomes exposed to the hunter, which makes her leave. With the fox hunter set upon hunting her down, Geum-ee tries to save her, but falls down in a lake which makes Geum-ee's soul trapped in a cage as a bird. Yobi tries to save him, but Mr. Shadow takes Geum-ee's soul. He states that his soul was taken from him long ago and that he needs one to become solid. Yobi defeats the shadow, grabbing the soul from his core whilst getting attacked in the soul lake.

Since they fell into the soul lake, Geum-ee crosses the dimension only to be told by the soul lake's gatekeepers that the number of souls in the lake must remain the same, and a soul can never go out unless another soul replaces it. Yobi then allows for Geum-ee's departure back to the human world by placing her own soul in the bird cage. Once he comes back to consciousness, Geum-ee tries to call for Yobi, but to no avail. He is last seen leaving with the teacher and the other students.

Some time later, Yobi's soul is released. Yobi becomes human and is most likely reincarnated to become human not too long after her soul had been exchanged. It is unknown if Yobi and Geum-ee see each other again or not.

Voice cast 
Son Ye-jin - Yobi
Ryu Deok-hwan - Hwang Geum-ee
Choi do-yeong - Joo-Hee
Jeong Ok-Joo - Jung Jong-ee
Gong Hyung-jin - Kang
Lee Jong-goo - The Fox Hunter
Kim So-hyeong - Mr. Shadow / Captain Yo
Lee hyang-sook - Forest Spirit
Lee hyun-joo - Naughty Yo
Sa Seong-ung - Jumbo Yo
Seo Yun-seok - Chubby Yo / Sambaba
Choi Moon-ja - Hairy Yo / Sambaba
Lee Sun-ho - Tiny Yo
Chae Eui-jin - Sambaba

References

External links 
  
 
 

2007 films
Animated films about foxes
South Korean animated films
South Korean animated science fiction films
2000s Korean-language films
CJ Entertainment films
Fictional soul collectors
Yōkai in anime and manga
Romance anime and manga
2000s South Korean films